The  was a political party in Japan.

History 
The party was established in January 1960 by a breakaway faction of the Japanese Socialist Party. Led by Suehiro Nishio, it was made up of members of the most moderate wing of the former Rightist Socialist Party of Japan, a moderate faction that had existed as an independent party between 1948 and 1955 before reluctantly merging back together with the Leftist Socialist Party of Japan. Although long-standing ideological differences and factional rivalries played a key role, the proximate cause of the split was internal disagreements over how to conduct the ongoing Anpo protests against revision of the Treaty of Mutual Cooperation and Security Between the United States and Japan, known as Anpo in Japanese, and whether or not to cooperate with the Communist Party of Japan in doing so.

Declassified United States government documents later revealed that covert CIA funding had also helped encourage the founding of this breakaway party. CIA support was aimed at moderating and subverting the political opposition to the ruling conservative Liberal Democratic Party, which was the main CIA funded party.

The DSP was dissolved in 1994 to join the New Frontier Party. In 1996, the Japan Socialist Party was transformed into the Social Democratic Party. Two years later, in 1998, the New Frontier Party dissolved and most former DSP members eventually joined the Democratic Party of Japan. Despite the dissolution of the DSP in 1994, its youth organisation (Minsha Youth) survived until 2003 and was a member of the International Union of Socialist Youth (IUSY). After Minsha Youth was dissolved, some of its former members and independent social democrats formed Young Socialists, a new youth organisation which retained full membership in IUSY; however, it was finally dissolved on 8 March 2008 without any successor organisation and abandoned its IUSY membership.

The tradition of the DSP is carried on by the Minsha kyōkai (民社協会, Democratic Socialist Group) as a faction within the liberal Democratic Party of Japan, Democratic Party and now centre-right Democratic Party for the People.

Political position and foreign policy 
The DSP has clamed that it was an anti-communist party that officially advocated democratic socialism and had pro-American foreign policy.

The DSP was rated "moderate", "moderate social-democratic",, "centrist" and "centre-left" by Japanese political standards at the time, but at the same time it was also regarded as a "conservative" political party.  It derived much of its financial and organisational support from the Domei private-sector labour confederation, but unlike other social-democratic political parties in Japan, the party was not hostile to accepting neoliberal policies and was socially conservative that opposed to class conflict. Due to the DSP's syncretic political position, the party's ideology is often referred to as right-wing social democracy (右派社会民主主義).

The DSP strongly backed the Japan–United States alliance and was hawkish in anti-communism and supported the right-wing Liberal Democratic Party's foreign policy. The DSP supported the Park Chung-hee regime in South Korea and the Chiang Kai-shek regime in Taiwan, and praised the coup caused by the Augusto Pinochet in Chile. As a result, the DSP was suspected of being a 'fascist party' by socialist parties in other countries. For this reason, the DSP was often called the "right-wing party" in Japan, but because the DSP had a belief in socialist ideals, it was classified as a political "centrist" along with the old Komeito at the time. In addition, the DSP was a member of left-wing Socialist International.

Leaders

Election results

House of Representatives

House of Councillors

See also 
 Blue Labour
 Democratic Socialists '70
 Social Democratic Party (UK)
 New Fraternity Party

References 

Anti-communist organizations in Japan
CIA activities in Asia
Defunct political parties in Japan
Defunct social democratic parties
Centrist parties in Japan
Centre-left parties in Asia
Conservative parties in Japan
Former member parties of the Socialist International
Paternalistic conservatism
Political parties established in 1960
Political parties disestablished in 1994
Social conservative parties
Social democratic parties in Japan
Syncretic political movements
1960 establishments in Japan
1994 disestablishments in Japan